The 2015 season for the  cycling team began in January at the Trofeo Santanyi–Ses Salines–Campos. The team participated in UCI Europe Tour races and UCI World Tour events when given a wildcard invitation.

2015 roster

Riders who joined the team for the 2015 season

Riders who left the team during or after the 2014 season

Season victories

Footnotes

References

External links
 

2015 road cycling season by team